Louis Nganga a Ndzando (1923 – February 13, 2014) was a Congolese prelate of the Catholic Church.

Ndzando was born in Ndeke Mabela and was ordained a priest on February 23, 1953. Ndzando was appointed auxiliary bishop of the Diocese of Lisala, as well as titular bishop of Athyra, on April 18, 1961 and ordained bishop on July 9, 1961. Ndzando was appointed bishop of the Diocese of Lisala on November 25, 1964 and retired from the diocese on July 6, 1997.

External links
Catholic-Hierarchy

1923 births
2014 deaths
Place of death missing
20th-century Roman Catholic bishops in the Democratic Republic of the Congo
Participants in the Second Vatican Council
20th-century Roman Catholic titular bishops
Roman Catholic bishops of Lisala
Democratic Republic of the Congo Roman Catholic bishops
21st-century Democratic Republic of the Congo people